There are several lakes named Mud Lake within the U.S. state of Mississippi.

 Mud Lake, DeSoto County, Mississippi and Shelby County, Tennessee.	
 Mud Lake, Holmes County, Mississippi.	
 Mud Lake, Neshoba County, Mississippi.	
 Mud Lake, Tate County, Mississippi.		
 Mud Lake, Tunica County, Mississippi.	
 Mud Lake, Tunica County, Mississippi.	
 Mud Lake, Tunica County, Mississippi.	
 Mud Lake, Yazoo County, Mississippi.

References
 USGS-U.S. Board on Geographic Names

Lakes of Mississippi